Khanqah Muhammad Panah railway station 
() is  located in  Pakistan.

See also
 List of railway stations in Pakistan
 Pakistan Railways

References

External links
Khanqah Muhammad Panah Railway Station Map

Railway stations in Punjab, Pakistan